Oxyloma elegans is a species of small European land snail, a terrestrial pulmonate gastropod mollusk belonging to the family Succineidae, the amber snails.

Description
The shell usually has fewer than 3 whorls. The body whorl is very large and the spire is short. The shell is yellowish amber coloured with irregular radial growth lines. The width of the shell is 6–8 mm. The height of the shell is 9–17 mm (up to 20 mm).

Genitalia differences separate Oxyloma elegans from Oxyloma sarsii and the genus Succinea. The epiphallus is slightly curved and inside a short penis prolongation distance between penis and the pedunculus is very short.

Ecology
Oxyloma elegans occurs on vegetation in moist habitats such as marshes.

Distribution
This species occurs in European countries and islands including:
 Great Britain
 Ireland
 Czech Republic - nearly threatened (NT)
 Poland
 Russia - Sverdlovsk oblast
 Ukraine
 Slovakia
 Bulgaria

References

External links

Succineidae
Gastropods described in 1826